The following articles deal with Soviet prisoners of war.
Camps for Russian prisoners and internees in Poland (1919–24)
Soviet prisoners of war in Finland during World War II (1939–45)
Nazi crimes against Soviet prisoners of war during World War II (1939–45)
Badaber Uprising of Soviet soldiers held in Pakistan in 1985